Cephalostichus is a genus of beetles in the family Carabidae, containing the following species:

 Cephalostichus laticeps (Straneo, 1953)
 Cephalostichus putzeysi (Chaudoir, 1876)

References

Pterostichinae